Anissa Dellidj (born 6 April 1993) is a footballer who plays as a forward. Born in France, she represents Algeria at international level.

Club career
Dellidj has played for Templemars Vendeville, Lille OSC, Grand Calais Pascal FC and FC Bousbecque Féminine in France.

International career
Dellidj was capped for Algeria at senior level during the 2020 UNAF Women's Tournament.

International goals
Scores and results list Algeria goal tally first

References

External links

1993 births
Living people
Algerian women's footballers
Women's association football forwards
Algeria women's international footballers
People from Seclin
Sportspeople from Nord (French department)
French women's footballers
Lille OSC (women) players
Division 1 Féminine players
French sportspeople of Algerian descent
Footballers from Hauts-de-France